The 1980 Southwest Conference men's basketball tournament was held February 28 – March 1, 1980 at HemisFair Arena in San Antonio, Texas. The first round took place February 25 at the higher seeded campus sites. 

Number 1 seed Texas A&M defeated 2 seed Arkansas 52-50 to win their 1st championship and receive the conference's automatic bid to the 1980 NCAA tournament.

Format and seeding 
The tournament consisted of 9 teams in a single-elimination tournament. The 3 seed received a bye to the Quarterfinals and the 1 and 2 seed received a bye to the Semifinals.

Tournament

References 

1979–80 Southwest Conference men's basketball season
Basketball competitions in San Antonio
Southwest Conference men's basketball tournament
20th century in San Antonio
College sports tournaments in Texas
1980 in sports in Texas